Thalheim-Altikon railway station is a railway station in the Swiss canton of Zurich and municipality of Thalheim an der Thur. It takes its name from Thalheim and the adjoining municipality of Altikon. The station is located on the Winterthur to Etzwilen line and is served by Zurich S-Bahn line S29, which links Winterthur and Stein am Rhein.

References

Thalheim-Altikon
Thalheim-Altikon